Little Cormorant Lake is a ground water-seepage freshwater lake with no inflow or outflow that is located south of the Audubon Township in Becker County. The lake contains many fish species including Walleye, Yellow Bullhead, Largemouth Bass, Northern Pike, Rock Bass, Yellow Perch, Black Bullhead, Bluegill and Brown Bullhead. Little Cormorant Lake is part of the Cormorant Lakes group.

References

Lakes of Becker County, Minnesota
Lakes of Minnesota